Tuolumne Grove is a giant sequoia grove located near Crane Flat in Yosemite National Park, at the southeastern edge of the Tuolumne River watershed. The grove contains many conifers, including a few Sequoiadendron giganteum as well as Abies concolor and Pinus lambertiana.

The grove hosts about six visible giant sequoias amongst a dense understory of dogwood. The grove also features the "Dead Giant", a fallen giant sequoia with a stagecoach-sized tunnel cut through it.

Gallery

See also
List of giant sequoia groves
Merced Grove - a nearby giant sequoia grove

References

Giant sequoia groves
Sequoiadendron
Yosemite National Park
Protected areas of Tuolumne County, California